Demarcation of a perimeter, when the protection of assets, personnel or buildings is required, is normally affected by the building of a perimeter fence system. The level of protection offered varies according to the threat level to the perimeter. Different types of perimeter fencing include:

 Timber fencing
 Palisade fencing
 Welded wire mesh fence fencing
 Chain-link fencing
 Rolled mesh fencing
 Metal railings

Vertical bar fencing has been the most popular form of perimeter security fence since the 1980s.  Since the 2000s, welded wire mesh and acoustic barriers have also become popular types of perimeter fence around the world. Vertical bar, acoustic barriers and welded mesh are used in commercial projects and landmarks, in schools, and in airports and transport hubs. 

In high-security applications, sensors may be attached to the fence that generate alarms when they detect someone cutting, climbing, or lifting the fence fabric. 
 

Domestic and residential projects have since the 1980s featured timber fencing as the perimeter to houses and gardens. Ornamental metal railings have also been employed.

In the United Kingdom, perimeter fencing is banned at any sporting stadium after the death of 97 people  at Hillsborough Stadium.

See also 
 Privacy fencing

References

Further reading
 White House Fence Construction
 Animal Welfare, Perimeter Fence Requirements, Technical Amendment
 Kunststoffzaun als Gartenzaun, Sichtschutzzaun oder Koppelzaun (in German)
 Fences or freestanding walls
 Maison : travaux extérieurs (in French)

Fences